Lemonade, Inc. offers renters' insurance, homeowners' insurance, car insurance, pet insurance and term life insurance in the United States as well as contents and liability policies in Germany and the Netherlands and renters insurance in France. The company is based in New York City. It has approximately 1 million customers and 70% of its customers are under the age of 35. The company is registered as a public benefit corporation and has a stated mission of ‘transforming insurance from a necessary evil into a social good." Its business plan includes annually giving a portion of its underwriting profits to a nonprofit organization chosen by each customer upon signup. Lemonade uses artificial intelligence and chatbots to process claims. 

In a 2020 study of customer satisfaction, J.D. Power ranked Lemonade as the highest among renters' insurance carriers.

On December 28, 2022, Lemonade stock (LMND) hit a new low, down over 80% from its IPO.

History
Lemonade was founded by Daniel Schreiber (former president of Powermat Technologies) and Shai Wininger (co-founder of Fiverr)  in April 2015. Dan Ariely joined in 2017 as the Chief Behavioral Officer.

In December 2015, the company secured $13 million in seed money from Sequoia Capital and Aleph.

In August 2016, the company raised $13 million in funding from XL Innovate (part of XL Group), followed by a $34 million Series B funding round in December 2016. The Series B round was led by General Catalyst with participation from Thrive Capital, Tusk Ventures, and GV (formerly Google Ventures).

In May 2016, Lemonade became one of the few insurance companies to receive B-Corporation certification.

In April 2017, the company announced additional investors: Allianz and Ashton Kutcher’s Sound Ventures. In December 2017, Softbank invested an additional $120 million in the company in a Series C round, increasing the total money raised by the company to around $180 million.

In April 2019, Lemonade announced a further $300 million investment in a Series D financing led by SoftBank Group, with participation from Allianz, General Catalyst, GV, OurCrowd, and Thrive Capital, increasing the total money raised by the company to $480 million.

In April 2020, the company launched in the Netherlands.

On July 1, 2020, the company became a public company via an initial public offering.

In December 2020, it began offering insurance in France. It also won a trademark dispute with T-Mobile over the use of the color pink.

In November 2021, the company announced that it would fully acquire Metromile, Inc. The acquisition completed on 29 July 2022, following which Lemonade laid off 20% of Metromile's staff.

See also
 List of United States insurance companies

References

External links 

Financial services companies established in 2015
Internet properties established in 2015
Insurance companies based in New York City
American companies established in 2015
Online insurance companies
Property insurance
Public benefit corporations based in the United States
2015 establishments in New York City
2020 initial public offerings
Companies listed on the New York Stock Exchange
B Lab-certified corporations